Netsai Marova is a Zimbabwean youth campaigner for the Movement for Democratic Change, who was abducted for two days at an anti-government protest in May 2020.

As a student at Chinhoyi University of Technology at the age of 15,Marova highlighted the vulnerable position of women students there in 2017. She has been mentored by MP Joana Mamombe, a fellow Chinhoyi student, and has in turn provided similar support to young girls in Mabvuku.

On 13 May 2020 she and two other women, MP Joana Mamombe and fellow youth activist Cecilia Chimbiri, were abducted by masked assailants at a Harare protest against the government's failure to provide for the poor during the COVID-19 pandemic. Two days later, the women were found, badly injured and traumatised, by the side of the road sixty miles from Harare. They reported having been tortured and repeatedly sexually assaulted. The three women were then charged with "communicating falsehoods" for their claims to have been abducted, tortured and held incommunicado by unidentified people. In August 2020 they appeared at court, and had their trial postponed until September 15.

Fearless MDC Alliance Youth Assembly official Netsai Marova’s name has appeared on the Gumiguru list of 50 under 30 emerging young leaders in Zimbabwe. Netsai is on sixth position.Wow! what an honour to be recognised, celebrated and counted on the list of 50 under 30 Emerging young leaders in Zimbabwe, class of 2021 being on number 6 and together with other phenomenal leaders

See also
List of kidnappings

References

Further reading 
 
 
 
 
 

Living people
1990s births
21st-century Zimbabwean women
Year of birth missing (living people)
Kidnapped Zimbabwean people
Prisoners and detainees of Zimbabwe
Zimbabwean torture victims
Zimbabwean activists
Zimbabwean women activists
Violence against women in Zimbabwe